A list of films produced in Italy in 1960 (see 1960 in film):

References

Bibliography

External links
Italian films of 1960 at the Internet Movie Database

Lists of 1960 films by country or language
1960
Films